Fashchivka is an urban-type settlement in Alchevsk Raion in Luhansk Oblast of eastern Ukraine. Population:

Demographics
Native language distribution as of the Ukrainian Census of 2001:
 Ukrainian: 2.28%
 Russian: 97.44%
 Others 0.28%

References

Urban-type settlements in Alchevsk Raion